Kamal Uddin (also spelled Kamaluddin) is a Pakistani politician who has been a member of the National Assembly of Pakistan since August 2018.

Political career
He was elected to the National Assembly of Pakistan as a candidate of Muttahida Majlis-e-Amal from NA-262 (Pishin) in 2018 Pakistani general election. He received 50,258 votes and defeated Muhammad Essa Khan, a candidate of Pashtunkhwa Milli Awami Party.

References

Living people
Pakistani MNAs 2018–2023
Muttahida Majlis-e-Amal MNAs
Year of birth missing (living people)